"Crash" is Cavo's second single from their debut album, Bright Nights Dark Days.

Music video

The music video for the song premiered in November 2009.

Chart positions

References

2009 singles
Cavo songs
2009 songs
Reprise Records singles
Songs written by Zac Maloy